Endococcus thelommatis is a species of lichenicolous (lichen-dwelling) fungus in the family Lichenotheliaceae. It was formally described as a new species in 2011 by lichenologists Jana Kocourková and Kerry Knudsen. The fungus grows on the lichen Thelomma santessonii, a common saxicolous (rock-dwelling), crustose lichen that is endemic to the coast and islands of Southern California and Mexico's Baja California. Endococcus thelommatis is the first lichenicolous fungus to have been reported from this lichen.

References

Dothideomycetes
Lichenicolous fungi
Fungi described in 2011
Fungi of North America